The women's 58 kilograms event at the 2006 Asian Games took place on December 3, 2006 at Al-Dana Banquet Hall in Doha.

Schedule
All times are Arabia Standard Time (UTC+03:00)

Records

Results 
Legend
NM — No mark

New records
The following records were established during the competition.

References

 Weightlifting Database
 Results

Weightlifting at the 2006 Asian Games